Scott Semptimphelter (born May 15, 1972) is a former American football quarterback who played five seasons in the Arena Football League (AFL) with the Orlando Predators, Nashville Kats, Los Angeles Avengers, Detroit Fury and New York Dragons. He played college football at Lehigh University and attended Holy Cross High School in Delran Township, New Jersey. He also attended training camp twice with the Dallas Cowboys of the National Football League.

College career
Semptimphelter was a two-year starter at Lehigh University. He threw for 3,449 yards and 30 touchdowns as a senior in 1993. Led Lehigh to its first Patriot League title in 1993, and was named the 1993 Patriot League MVP.  He passed for 6,669 yards and 51 touchdowns in his career.  Leaving Lehigh, he held the record for TD Passes in a game (6), most passing yards in a game (480), and 2nd in TD passes in a season(30).  25 years after his last season, he still holds the 5th best season for passing yards in a season (3,449).

Professional career
Semptimphelter spent time with the Dallas Cowboys' training camp roster in 1995 and 1996. The Predators lost in the second round of the playoffs to the Iowa Barnstormers. He was traded to the Nashville Kats in April 1998 for the rights to John Dewitt II. Semptimphelter served as the backup to Andy Kelly. Scott was traded to the Los Angeles Avengers in December 1999 for a third round draft pick. He was the first starting quarterback in franchise history. Semptimphelter was signed by the AFL's Detroit Fury on January 2, 2001. The Fury lost in the first round of the playoffs to the Arizona Rattlers. He was signed by the New York Dragons of the AFL on April 25, 2002. Semptimphelter was traded to the Detroit Fury on June 3, 2002.

Coaching career
Semptimphelter was offensive coordinator of Holy Cross High School in Delran Township, New Jersey from 1994 to 1997. He was offensive coordinator of Brentwood High School in Brentwood, Tennessee from 2003 to 2004.
From 2010 thru 2015, Scott served as President of the Brentwood Blaze Youth Football Program, and from 2012 to 2015, the president of TNYFL.
Since 2013, he has coached QB's at Battle Ground Academy in Franklin, TN.

Personal life
Semptimphelter met his wife, Traci, in 1997 at a postgame gathering after a game between the Orlando Predators and Nashville Kats. At the time, Semptimphelter was a player for the Predators and Traci was a cheerleader for the Kats.

References

External links
 Just Sports Stats

Living people
1972 births
American football quarterbacks
Dallas Cowboys players
Detroit Fury players
Lehigh Mountain Hawks football players
Los Angeles Avengers players
Nashville Kats coaches
Nashville Kats players
New York Dragons players
Orlando Predators players
High school football coaches in New Jersey
High school football coaches in Tennessee
Holy Cross Academy (New Jersey) alumni
People from Florence Township, New Jersey
Sportspeople from Burlington County, New Jersey
Players of American football from New Jersey